Col. Elmer E. Ellsworth Monument and Grave is a historic site within Hudson View Cemetery in Mechanicville, New York.

The monument to Elmer E. Ellsworth, the first Union officer casualty of the American Civil War, was built in 1874 and added to the National Register of Historic Places in 1976.

In 1997 the  bronze eagle was stolen from the top of the monument.  The eagle was recognized and returned by an antique dealer in 1998.

References

External links
 
 

Cemeteries in Saratoga County, New York
Monuments and memorials on the National Register of Historic Places in New York (state)
1874 sculptures
National Register of Historic Places in Saratoga County, New York